George Cook (20 November 1904 – after 1932) was an English professional footballer. He was born in Shankhouse, Northumberland.

Cook, a right-back, began his career with Bedlington United, joining Gillingham and making his league debut in the 1924–25 season. The same season saw Cook move to Preston North End where he made 23 league appearances. He then joined Torquay United and played in their first ever game in the Football League, a 1–1 draw at home to local rivals Exeter City on 27 August 1927. He played 29 times that season for Torquay before moving to Carlisle United in 1928. He played in Carlisle's first ever league game, a 3–2 win against Accrington Stanley on 25 August 1928. He played 23 times that season before moving to non-league Sittingbourne.
  
He subsequently moved to Blyth Spartans before joining Everton in 1930. He failed to make the first team at Goodison Park, moving to Tranmere Rovers. His only appearance for Tranmere came in December 1931, playing at centre-half in a 9–1 win at home to Rochdale. He returned to Carlisle United, playing five further league games before ending his league career.

References
 

1904 births
Year of death missing
English footballers
Footballers from Northumberland
Association football defenders
Bedlington United A.F.C. players
Gillingham F.C. players
Preston North End F.C. players
Torquay United F.C. players
Carlisle United F.C. players
Sittingbourne F.C. players
Blyth Spartans A.F.C. players
Everton F.C. players
Tranmere Rovers F.C. players
English Football League players
People from Cramlington